The iHeartRadio Music Awards is a music awards show that celebrates music heard throughout the year across iHeartMedia radio stations nationwide and on iHeartRadio, iHeartMedia's digital music platform. Founded by iHeartRadio in 2014, the event recognizes the most popular artists and music over the past year. Winners are chosen per cumulative performance data, while the public is able to vote in several categories.

The inaugural event was held on May 1, 2014, at the Shrine Auditorium in Los Angeles. Its first two years were broadcast live on NBC; from 2016 to 2018, it was simulcast on TBS, TNT and TruTV. The sixth annual iHeartRadio Music Awards were held on March 14, 2019, at Los Angeles' Microsoft Theater and was the first to air on Fox. The trophy is manufactured by the New York firm Society Awards.

Overview
The nominations are based on results from the iHeartRadio Chart. It includes listener feedback and performance data, according to airplay; digital streaming data from the iHeartRadio platform, including sales, social, online video data and tags from BigChampagne and Shazam. The iHeartRadio Countdown, the two-hour weekly program, highlights the top 20 contemporary hit radio songs in the iHeartRadio Chart. The latter is supplied and compiled by Mediabase. In addition, every public-voting category (nine in 2018), includes social hashtags as the primary voting mechanism.

List of ceremonies

Award categories 

The categories cover an array of genres, including pop, alternative rock, hip-hop, R&B, Latin and regional Mexican music. Public-voting categories through social media are indicated with a double dagger.

Current award categories
 Song of the Year (2014–present)
 Artist of the Year (2014–2015, 2023)
 Female Artist of the Year (2016–present)
 Male Artist of the Year (2016–present)
 Best Duo/Group of the Year (2016–present)
 Best New Artist (2014–present)
 Best Collaboration (2014–present)
 Pop Album of the Year (2017–present)
 Best New Pop Artist (2017–present)
 Alternative Rock Song of the Year (2014–present)
 Alternative Rock Artist of the Year (2016–present)
 Alternative Rock Album of the Year (2017–present)
 Best New Rock/Alternative Rock Artist (2017–present)
 Rock Song of the Year (2016–present)
 Rock Artist of the Year (2016–present)
 Rock Album of the Year (2017–present)
 Country Song of the Year (2014–present)
 Country Artist of the Year (2016–present)
 Country Album of the Year (2017–present)
 Best New Country Artist (2017–present)
 Dance Song of the Year (2015–present)
 Dance Artist of the Year (2016–present)
 Dance Album of the Year (2017–present)
 Hip-Hop Song of the Year (2016–present)
 Hip-Hop Artist of the Year (2016–present)
 Hip-Hop Album of the Year (2017–present)
 iHeartRadio Chart Ruler Award (2022)
 Best New Hip-Hop Artist (2017–present)
 R&B Song of the Year (2016–present)
 R&B Artist of the Year (2016–present)
 R&B Album of the Year (2017–present)
 Best New R&B Artist (2017–present)
 Latin Song of the Year (2016–present)
 Latin Artist of the Year (2016–present)
 Latin Album of the Year (2017–present)
 Best New Latin Artist (2017–present)
 Regional Mexican Song of the Year (2016–present)
 Regional Mexican Artist of the Year (2016–present)
 Producer of the Year (2017–present)
 Songwriter of the Year (2019)
 Best Fan Army (2014–present) 
 Best Lyrics (2014–present) 
 Best Cover Song (2016–present) 
 Best Music Video (2017–present) 
 Social Star Award (2017–present) 
 Cutest Musician Pet (2018–present) 
 Best Solo Breakout (2017–present) 
 Song That Left Us Shook (2019) 
 Favorite Tour Photographer (2019) 
 Best Tour (2016–present)
 Label of the Year (2017–present)
 Most Thumbed-Up Song of the Year (2017–present)
 Most Thumbed-Up Artist of the Year (2017–present)

Past award categories
 Best Song from a Movie (2016–2017) 
 Best Underground Alternative Band (2017) 
 Regional Mexican Album of the Year (2017)
 Album of the Year (2016)
 Biggest Triple Threat (2016) 
 Most Meme-able Moment (2016) 
 Hip-Hop/R&B Song of the Year (2014–2015)
 EDM Song of the Year (2014)
 Renegade (2015)
 Instagram Award (2014)
 Best New Regional Mexican Artist (2017–2018)
 Best Boy Band (2018) 
 Best Remix (2018)

Special awards

iHeartRadio Innovator Award
The honor is presented to artists for their contribution to popular culture.
 2014: Pharrell Williams
 2015: Justin Timberlake
 2016: U2
 2017: Bruno Mars
 2018: Chance the Rapper
 2019: Alicia Keys
 2023: Taylor Swift

iHeartRadio Icon Award
 2018: Bon Jovi
 2021: Elton John
 2022: Jennifer Lopez
 2023: Pink

Artist of the Decade
 2019: Garth Brooks

Fangirls Award
 2018: Camila Cabello
 2019: Halsey

Young Influencer
 2014: Ariana Grande

Multiple wins and nominations
Most wins (as of 2022)

Most nominations (as of 2023)

Performances

See also
 iHeartRadio Much Music Video Awards
 iHeartRadio Music Festival

Notes

References

External links
 

 
Awards established in 2014
American music awards
2014 establishments in California
NBC original programming
TBS (American TV channel) original programming
TNT (American TV network) original programming
TruTV original programming
Fox Broadcasting Company original programming